Eulalio Ríos Alemán (21 January 1935 – c. 1980) was a Mexican Olympic swimmer.

Family 
He was born to a low-income family in a small town in the state of Veracruz, and from a young age he trained to swim against the current of a brook that passed near his home, in Hueyapan de Ocampo, to the south of Catemaco on the road to Coatzacoalcos.

Early years 
He was already a fast freestyle swimmer with a thudding kick when he went to Xalapa to study law and to be coached in swimming.

In 1956 he learned the butterfly stroke under the guidance of his trainer Antonio Murrieta and watched an exhibition of the (by that time) "new dolphin kick" technique by the experienced swimmer Walter Ocampo, of Mexico City's Centro Deportivo Chapultepec.

He practiced and learned quickly in the cold waters of the rustic pool "La PLaya", near Los Berros park in Xalapa.

Within a few months he swam successfully in the olympic trials and was ready to compete for Mexico in the 1956 Melbourne Olympic Games.

Competitions, records, prizes 
 Panamerican Games
 Centroamerican Games
 USA Open National Championships
 1956 Melbourne Olympic Games: He competed in the 200 meters butterfly, passed the qualifications heats and participated in the final, becoming the first Mexican swimmer to have done so in Olympic Games.
 See: 200 m butterfly final in 1956
 1960 Rome Olympic Games Eulalio reached the semifinals.
 See: 200 m butterfly semifinal #1 in 1960.
 "Trofeo Latinoamericano Cabeza De Palenque" awarded by the International Swimming Hall Of Fame" (at Fort Lauderdale, FL) "for the 1956 Olympics where he placed 6th in the 200m fly".

Notes 

Mexican male swimmers
Olympic swimmers of Mexico
Sportspeople from Veracruz
Swimmers at the 1955 Pan American Games
Swimmers at the 1956 Summer Olympics
Swimmers at the 1959 Pan American Games
Swimmers at the 1960 Summer Olympics
People from Xalapa
1935 births
1980s deaths
Pan American Games gold medalists for Mexico
Pan American Games bronze medalists for Mexico
Pan American Games medalists in swimming
Central American and Caribbean Games gold medalists for Mexico
Competitors at the 1959 Central American and Caribbean Games
Competitors at the 1962 Central American and Caribbean Games
Central American and Caribbean Games medalists in swimming
Medalists at the 1955 Pan American Games
20th-century Mexican people